Antoine Bourdelle (30 October 1861 – 1 October 1929), born Émile Antoine Bordelles, was an influential and prolific French sculptor and teacher. He was a student of Auguste Rodin, a teacher of Giacometti and Henri Matisse, and an important figure in the Art Deco movement and the transition from the Beaux-Arts style to modern sculpture.

His studio became the Musée Bourdelle, an art museum dedicated to his work, located at 18, rue Antoine Bourdelle, in the 15th arrondissement of Paris, France.

Early life and education
Émile Antoine Bourdelle was born at Montauban, Tarn-et-Garonne in France on 30 October 1861. His father was a wood craftsman and cabinet-maker. In 1874, at the age of thirteen, he left school to work in his father's workshop, and also began carving his first sculptures of wood.

In 1876, with the assistance of writer Émile Pouvillon, he received a scholarship to attend the School of Fine Arts in Toulouse, though he remained fiercely independent and resisted the formal program. In 1884, at the age of twenty-four, he earned second place in the competition to enter the École des Beaux-Arts in Paris. There he worked in the studio of Alexandre Falguière and frequented the studio of Jules Dalou, who was his neighbor.

Career 

In 1885 he participated in the annual Salon of artists and won an honorable mention for his work, The First Victory of Hannibal. He rented a studio at 16 Impasse du Main, next to the painters Eugène Carrière and Jean-Paul Laurens. He worked in this studio until his death.

In 1887, he quit the studio of Falguièr, and, moved by the music of Beethoven, he made his first of what would eventually be some forty sculptures of the composer. In September 1893 Bourdelle joined the studio of Auguste Rodin.  His collaboration with Rodin lasted fifteen years.  In 1895, he received his first official commission, a war monument for the city of Montauban.  His proposed plans, different from traditional monuments, created a scandal.  Rodin intervened on his behalf, and the monument was finally erected in 1902.

In 1900, Bourdelle demonstrated his independence from Rodin's style with a bust of Apollo. In the same year,  Bourdelle, Rodin and the sculptor Desbois opened a free school of sculpture, the Institut Rodin-Debois-Bourdelle. One of the students was Henri Matisse, who later produced some remarkable sculpture, but the school did not last long.

In 1905, Bourdelle had his first personal exhibition, in the gallery of the foundry-owner Hébrand.  With the support of Hébrand and the material assistance of his foundry, Bourdelle was able to make larger works and earn greater recognition.  His father died in 1906, and Bourdelle changed his first name to simply Antoine, after his father. He married his second wife, Cléopatre Sevastos (1892-1972), who was of Greek origin. She and their daughter, Rhodia, became a frequent inspiration for his works.

In 1908, Bourdelle left the studio of Rodin and set out on his own. In 1909 he exhibited a new work, Hercules the Archer at the annual Salon of the Societé Nationale des Beaux-Arts. He began to teach at the Académie de la Grande Chaumière, where his students included Giacometti and Adaline Kent.

In 1913 the Théâtre des Champs-Élysées was inaugurated, with decoration on the facade and the interior atrium designed by Bourdelle. This work announced the debut of the Art Deco style, and was an important step towards modernism. He was a participant in the 1913 Armory Show in New York, a founder and vice-president of the Parisian Salon des Tuileries. He remained in Paris during the First World War, working on a commission for an art patron from Argentina, Rodolfo Acorta, a monument to General Alvear, which was inaugurated in Buenos Aires in 1925. In 1929, his first major public sculpture in Paris, the monument to the Polish hero Mickiewicz, was inaugurated on Place d'Alma.

Death and legacy 

Bourdelle, in poor health, died at Le Vésinet, near Paris, on 1 October 1929 and was interred in the Cimetière du Montparnasse, Paris, France.

Museums 
Today the Musée Bourdelle in Paris sits amidst brick houses at 18 rue Antoine Bourdelle, a small street between the Gare Montparnasse and the offices of the famous French newspaper Le Monde. The museum consists of Bourdelle's house, studio, and garden where he worked from 1884 to 1929.

In the 1930s his widow opened his art studio for viewings. In 1949, the atelier of Bourdelle was donated by his former spouse Cléopâtre and his daughter to the city of Paris and it was opened as the Musée Bourdelle, additionally the street was renamed as rue Antoine Bourdelle.

A second museum, the Bourdelle Garden-Museum in Égreville, France was established by his daughter and son-in-law starting in 1969 and hosts another 56 of Bourdelle's sculptures in a garden setting.

Collections 

His art work is in many public collections worldwide, including Musée d'Orsay (Paris), the National Museum of Western Art (Tokyo), List Visual Arts Center at MIT (Cambridge, Massachusetts), Harvard University Art Museums (Cambridge, Massachusetts), Cleveland Museum of Art, National Museum of Art of Romania, Fine Arts Museums of San Francisco, Courtauld Institute of Art (London), Galleria Nazionale d'Arte Moderna (Rome), Hermitage Museum (Saint Petersburg, Russia), Hirshhorn Museum and Sculpture Garden (Washington D.C.), Honolulu Museum of Art, Kimbell Art Museum (Fort Worth, Texas), Kröller-Müller Museum (Otterlo, Netherlands), the Minneapolis Institute of Art, Museo Nacional de Bellas Artes (Buenos Aires), the National Galleries of Scotland, National Gallery of Australia, Musée Ingres (Montauban), the Royal Museums of Fine Arts of Belgium, Middelheim Open Air Sculpture Museum (Antwerp, Belgium), and the Museum of Fine Arts (St. Petersburg, Florida), among others.

Personal life 

In 1904, Bourdelle married artist Stephanie van Parys (also known as Vanparys, 1877–1945). His wife often served as a model for Bourdelle; by 1910 they had divorced. Together with van Parys they had a son, Pierre Bourdelle (c.1903–1966) and Pierre became an artist most active in the United States, and notable for his work at Cincinnati Union Terminal in 1933.

Bourdelle married in 1918 his former art student, Cléopâtre Sevastos (1882–1972), who also served as his model. Together with Sevastos they had a daughter, Rhodia Bourdelle (her married name was Dufet, Dufet–Bourdelle, 1911–2002) and she was an art curator.

Honors 
In 1909 he was named Knight of the Legion of Honor, in 1919 Officier of the Legion of Honor, and in 1924 became a Commander of the Legion of Honor.

Sculpture

Students
Artists who studied with Antoine Bourdelle included:

 Athanase Apartis, Greece
 Alfredo Bigatti, Argentina
 Lucie Bouniol, France
 Margaret Butler (sculptor), New Zealand
 Samuel Cashwan, United States
 Pablo Curatella Manes, Argentina
 Margaret Cossaceanu, Romania
 Céline Emilian, Romania
 Béni Ferenczy, Hungary
 Helen Margaret George, England
 Alberto Giacometti, Switzerland
 Angela Gregory, United States
 Otto Gutfreund, Czechoslovakia
 Minna Harkavy, United States
 Bror Hjorth, Sweden
 René Iché, France
 Mladen Josić, Serbia
 Raoul Josset, France/United States
 David Karfunkle, Austria/United States
 Adaline Kent, United States
 Emile Lahner, Hungary
 Aristide Maillol, France
 Henri Matisse, France
 Vadym Meller, Ukraine
 Marguerite Milward, England
 Vera Mukhina, Russian Empire/USSR
 Bencho Obreshkov, Bulgaria
 Dudley Pratt, United States
 Virginia Claflin Pratt, United States
 Germaine Richier, France
 Arnold Rönnebeck, Germany/United States
 Ada Mae Sharpless, United States
 Maria Helena Vieira da Silva, Portugal
 Risto Stijović, Serbia
 Sreten Stojanović, Serbia
 Mihailo Tomić, Serbia
 Josefina de Vasconcellos, England
 Anna Marie Valentien, United States
 Helen Wilson, United States
 Louise Lentz Woodruff, United States
 Ryumon Yasuda, Japan
 Teodors Zalkalns, Latvia
 José Luis Zorrilla de San Martín, Uruguay

For a first hand account of Bourdelle's teaching style see Arnold Ronnebeck's article from 1925, published in The Arts 8, no. 4 titled "Bourdelle Speaks to His Pupils: From a Paris Diary."

See also 
Art Deco in Paris

Notes and citations

Bibliography
 Colin Lemoine, Antoine Bourdelle. L'oeuvre à demeure, Paris, Paris-Musées, 2009
 Bourdelle, Émile-Antoine, "Émile-Antoine Bourdelle, Sculptures and Drawings", Perth, Western Australian Art Gallery, 1978.
 Jeancolas, Claude, Sculpture Française, CELIV, Paris (1992),
 Ottawa.National Gallery of Canada, "Antoine Bourdelle, 1861-1929", New York, C. E. Slatkin Galleries, 1961.
 Colin Lemoine, Antoine Bourdelle, Paris, Cercle d'art, 2004,()
 Antoine Bourdelle, passeur de la modernité, exhibition catalogue (curators Roxana Theodorescu, Juliette Laffon and Colin Lemoine / Catalogue Colin Lemoine), Bucarest, National Museum of Art, 2006
 Colin Lemoine, Le Fruit : une œuvre majuscule d'Antoine Bourdelle, Ligeia, January–June 2005, n°57-58-59-60, p. 60-78
 Colin Lemoine, "...sans ce modelé à la Rodin, à la XVIIIe siècle qui beurre le tout : Bourdelle et la question d'un primitivisme occidental", Bulletin du musée Ingres, May 2006, n° 78, p. 49-66
 Cléopâtre Sevastos, Ma vie avec Bourdelle, Paris-Musées-Editions des Cendres, 2005 (annoted edition by Colin Lemoine)
 Véronique Gautherin, L'Oeil et la main (2000)
 Antoine Bourdelle, d'un siècle l'autre. L'eurythmie de la modernité, exhibition catalogue by Colin Lemoine, Japan (Kitakyushu, Niigata, Takamatsu, Iwaki, Nagoya, Seoul), 2007–2008.

External links

 
 Musée Bourdelle (in French)
 Portrait of Rodin from Antoine Bourdelle, on the official website of the Musée Rodin.
National Art Gallery and Alexander Soutzos Museum, Bourdelle Emile-Antoine, Biography (in English)
 

1861 births
1929 deaths
People from Montauban
École des Beaux-Arts alumni
Burials at Montparnasse Cemetery
19th-century French painters
French male painters
20th-century French painters
Art Deco sculptors
Commandeurs of the Légion d'honneur
20th-century French sculptors
20th-century French male artists
19th-century French sculptors
French male sculptors
19th-century French male artists